Archana Chandhoke, more simply known as Archana, is an Indian television presenter, actress, and radio jockey who has primarily worked in Tamil film and television industry.

Career

Television
In September 1999 Chandhoke started her career as a newsreader in Jaya TV's English News while studying in college. She later moved on to Sun TV, where she hosted the shows Comedy Time and Ilamai Pudhumai. In May 2007, she left Sun TV to prioritize family commitments.

After a break of one year she joined Star Vijay in 2008 and hosted Namma Veetu Kalyanam till 2014. In September 2015, Zee Tamil approached her to do the show Athirshta Lakshmi. The following year, she appeared as a judge of the comedy show Junior Super Star along with K. Bhagyaraj and Khushbu.

In 2020 Archana entered Bigg Boss as a wildcard contestant. She received criticism from audiences for her behavior on the show. Following her stint on the show, she rejoined Star Vijay and is hosting various reality shows and also various special episodes like Kadhale Kadhale, Old is Gold Black and White, Parivattam, Namma veetu kalyanam Snehan and Kanikka Special, Singappene, Namma veetu thiruvizha, Samsaram athu Minsaram, Sabash Sariyana Potti, Pattikada Pattanama, Thai illamal Naanillai and Udanpirappe(Paasa Malargal).

In 2022 she rejoined Zee Tamil to host the most popular show, Super Mom season 3. She is hosting this show along with her daughter Zaara Vineet.

Films
Chandhoke has also worked as an actress in Tamil-language films, often portraying comedy roles. She first appeared in En Vazhi Thani Vazhi (2015), an action film starring and produced by businessman R. K. During the audio release function of the film, she was confronted by actor Radharavi on stage, who felt she failed to address him with respect. R. K. then cast her again in his next film, Vaigai Express (2017) in another small role.

Her appearance in Yenda Thalaiyila Yenna Vekkala (2018) saw her feature as a cheating wife in love with the character portrayed by Yogi Babu. A reviewer noted the scenes were "high on adult content but manages to evoke a smile". She was seen in Doctor (2021), where she featured alongside her daughter Zaara in a supporting role.

Filmography

Television

Television Host

Reality shows

Televisions serials

Radio

YouTube

Presenter

Award Shows and Live Shows

Awards and Nominations

Television Awards

Film Awards

References

External links 
 

Living people
Television personalities from Tamil Nadu
Tamil television presenters
People from Chennai
Indian women television presenters
Indian television presenters
Tamil television actresses
Actresses in Tamil cinema
Actresses in Tamil television
Bigg Boss (Tamil TV series) contestants
1982 births